is a Japanese actress best known for playing Hotaru Kuroita in the long-running television drama Kita no Kuni kara ("From a Northern Country"). She won the award for best supporting actress at the 12th Yokohama Film Festival for Tugumi.

Filmography

Films
 Tokei – Adieu l'hiver (1986)
 Tugumi (1990)
 Chizuko's Younger Sister (1991)
 Dance till Tomorrow (1991)
 Parasite Eve (1997)
 Give It All (1998)
 The Taste of Tea (2004)
 Tokyo Family (2013)
 What a Wonderful Family! (2016)
 What a Wonderful Family! 2 (2017)
 A Beautiful Star (2017)
 What a Wonderful Family! 3: My Wife, My Life (2018)
 One Day, You Will Reach the Sea (2022)

Television
 Kita no Kuni kara (1981–2002), Hotaru Kuroita
 Atsuhime (2008), Shigeno

References

1971 births
Living people
Japanese actresses
People from Tokyo